The National Liberation Movement was a Ghanaian political party formed in 1954. Set up by disaffected Ashanti members of the Convention People's Party, who were joined by Kofi Abrefa Busia, the NLM opposed the process of centralization whilst supporting a continuing role for traditional leaders. It  was led by Baffour Akoto, linguist to the Asantehene. The party gained some support in the Gold Coast legislative election, 1956 and became the third largest party in the Assembly with 12 seats, behind the Convention People's Party and the Northern People's Party. 

The Avoidance of Discrimination Act, passed by Kwame Nkrumah in 1957 outlawed parties based on racial, regional, or religious differences and as such the NLM became part of the newly formed opposition group the United Party.

References

Defunct political parties in Ghana
Political parties established in 1954
1954 establishments in Gold Coast (British colony)
Political parties disestablished in 1957